A hit parade is a list of tunes that are most popular at any given time.

Hit Parade or hitparade or The Hit Parade may also refer to:

Film and television
 Hit Parade (film), a 1953 West German musical film
 Hit Parade (TV series), a 1956-1959 Australian pop music series
 The Hit Parade (film), a 1937 American musical film directed by Gus Meins

Hit Parade of
Hit Parade of 1941, a 1940 American film directed by John H. Auer
Hit Parade of 1943, also known as Change of Heart, 1943 American musical film made by Republic Pictures and directed by Albert S. Rogell
Hit Parade of 1951, a 1950 American musical film directed by John H. Auer

Literature
Hit Parade, a novel by Lawrence Block

Music 
Bands
 The Hit Parade (group), an independent pop group from London, England

Albums
 Hit Parade (Audio Adrenaline album), 2001
 Hit Parade (Spirit of the West album), 1999
 Hit Parade (Paul Weller album), 2006
 Hit Parade 1, a 1992 compilation album by The Wedding Present
 Hit Parade 2, a 1993 compilation album by The Wedding Present
 The Hit Parade (Puffy AmiYumi album),  a 2002 album by Puffy AmiYumi
 The Hit Parade (Tak Matsumoto album), a 2003 album by Tak Matsumoto
 Hit Parade (Róisín Murphy album), a 2023 album by Róisín Murphy

Songs
 "Hit Parade", a song by The Beautiful South from Painting It Red

See also
Collins and Maconie's Hit Parade, a British radio programme 1994–1997 
 hitparade.ch or Swiss Hitparade, Switzerland's main music sales charts 
  Hit Parader, an American music magazine
 Your Hit Parade, an American radio and TV series 1935-1959
 ZDF-Hitparade, or simply Hitparade, a music television series by German TV channel ZDF